Xiachuan Island (Hsiachwan Shan) is an island of the South China Sea, on the southern coast of China, part of the Guangdong province.

Administration
Administratively, Chuandao is one of the 16 towns of Taishan.

Geography
The island is located near the larger Shangchuan Island, which lies East of Xiachuan.

Economy
Shangchuan and Xiachuan have been established as a Tourism Open Integrated Experimental Zones.

Transportation
Xiachuan Island is linked from the mainland by ferry.
There is also ferry service between Xiachuan and its sister island Shangchuan Island.

See also

 Chuanshan Archipelago
 Geography of China
 List of islands of the People's Republic of China
 List of islands in the South China Sea

External links

 Xiachuan on taishan.com 
 Xiachuan on tsinfo.com.cn 
 Detailed description of the island 
 Another detailed description of the island 
 Map of the island 

Taishan, Guangdong
Islands of Guangdong
Islands of the South China Sea
Islands of China
Populated places in China